Tambaram Air Force Station is an Indian Air Force airfield in Chennai, Tamil Nadu, India. Located in the neighborhood of Tambaram, this Air Force station is primarily involved in the training of pilots as Qualified Flying Instructors and Mechanical Training Institute for airmen.

What started as RAF Station Tambaram, in the Madras Presidency, in the southeast of the British India, it became the Tambaram Air Force Station after the British left.

The station has a squadron of 15 Pilatus PC-7 Mk II basic trainers by 2015 at the Flying Instructors School. The PC-7 will join a fleet that comprises Kiran Mk I and Mk II trainer aircraft, and HAL Cheetah and HAL Chetak helicopters. An An-32 transport squadron is stationed here.  Apart from training, helicopters from the Indian Navy have also been operated from this airfield.

In 2017 the Indian Air Force proposed to lengthen the runway so that larger aircraft could land to assist with natural disasters. 
In the Covid Period, National Airlines flew to Tambaram Air Force Station from Dover in the USA on their 747-400 N919CA and it lasted about 16 hours and 25 minutes from 30 July 2020 to 31 July 2020.

Use by smaller civilian aircraft
There are plans to use the air force station to handle smaller civilian ATR aircraft (with a capacity of 70 to 80 passengers) to decongest the Chennai International Airport.

References

See also
Chennai International Airport
List of Indian Air Force Bases

Indian Air Force bases
Airports in Tamil Nadu
World War II sites in India
Airports with year of establishment missing